Ed Dempsey was the head coach of the Prince George Spruce Kings of the British Columbia Hockey League. He moved to the lower-tier Spruce Kings after being dismissed as the head coach for the Prince George Cougars of the Western Hockey League.

External links 

Kamloops Blazers coaches
Living people
Michigan Tech Huskies men's ice hockey players
Place of birth missing (living people)
Prince George Cougars coaches
Year of birth missing (living people)
NCAA men's ice hockey national champions